Kotha Poradu is a 2020 Indian Telugu-language romantic Drama webseries written and directed by debutant Anvesh Michael for Allu Aravind's streaming platform Aha. Series stars Anvesh Michael,Raj Tirandasu,Sai Prasanna, and Jagadeesh Prathap Bandari in lead roles. The series was one of the first five shows produced for the launch of Aha, scheduled to release on 8 February 2020. Smaran, who has composed brilliant music for the Director Krish's Masti's composed tracks for Kotha Poradu.

Plot 
Kotha Poradu is set in Telangana backdrop which follows the story of Raju, a care-free village guy who is new to the city. While his struggle seems to be never-ending, fate has a different plan in store for him. He is forced to leave his village and move to the city in order to pay the debts of his deceased father. He gets to meet a film maker in Hyderabad and how his life takes a turn after that forms rest of the story.

Cast 

 Anvesh Michael as Raju
 Raj Tirandasu as Nethi Rajesh
 Jagadeesh Prathap Bandhari as Mallesh
 Sai Prasanna as Begumpet Sukanya
 Sripal Macharla as Director
 Sudhakar Reddy as Istarayya (Raju's father)
 Thanmai Bolt as Nagma (Setu Bidda)
 Camp Sasi as Producer
 Anusha Nuthula as Rajitha (Nethi Rajesh's wife)

Episodes

Soundtrack 
The soundtrack is composed by Smaran and release limited to YouTube. In 2022, the whole album was made available on all streaming platforms.

Reception 
The series opened to positive reviews which praised the show for its technical brilliance, performances and new-age story telling format and a simple story. Prakash Pecheti on Telangana Today said "The web series ‘Kotha Poradu’ streaming on OTT platform ‘aha’ kindles an unending fire of passion"  Critics also recognized the shows potential and establishments of locale in the show.

References

External links 

 
 Kotha Poradu on Aha

Aha (streaming service) original programming
Indian drama television series
Indian drama web series
2020 web series debuts
2020 web series endings
Telugu-language web series